Béla Lőwig (7 July 1902 – 1982) was a Hungarian boxer. He competed in the men's lightweight event at the 1924 Summer Olympics. He also worked as a bodyguard for the Hungarian Prime Minister Ferenc Szálasi.

References

External links
 

1902 births
1982 deaths
Hungarian male boxers
Olympic boxers of Hungary
Boxers at the 1924 Summer Olympics
Place of birth missing
Lightweight boxers
20th-century Hungarian people